Adalene is a Nashville, Tennessee-based rock band formed in the fall of 2009 featuring Brett Moyer (ex-Return to Self) on vocals, Josh Mitchell (Protea) on guitar/keys, Jonathan Stoye on bass, Corey Rozzoni (ex-Burden Brothers, Lights of Marfa) on guitar, and Jeremy Moore (ex-Faktion) on drums.

The band released their debut EP "Night On Fire" independently in 2010.

Biography
Adalene is a rock band from Nashville, TN composed of Brett Moyer (ex-Return to Self) on vocals, Josh Mitchell (Protea) on guitar, Jonathan Stoye (Framing Hanely) on bass guitar, Corey "Rizzo" Rozzoni (ex-Burden Brothers, Lights of Marfa) on guitar, and Jeremy Moore (ex-3 Pill Morning/Faktion) on drums.

Hiatus (2013-Present)
Shortly after the release of "Atlantic Heart", the band announced via Facebook that they would be taking a break. Citing the hiatus as amicable, the members embarked on various projects: bassist Jonathan Stoye joined Framing Hanely while guitarist Corey Rozzoni started a collaborative project called Lights of Marfa, and in May 2019 guitarist Josh Mitchell formed a rock/pop trio in Michigan called Protea.

Discography

EPs and singles 
Night On Fire (2010)
Atlantic Heart (2013)

Press 
 Strum Magazine

Television 
 Not Just Country TV | NJCTV

External links
 Official Site
 Facebook
 ReverbNation
 Myspace

References 

Rock music groups from Tennessee
Musical groups from Nashville, Tennessee